Dick Bosse is a former professional tennis player from South Africa.

Bosse qualified for the US Open twice, in 1990 and 1992. He lost in the first round at both tournaments, to Glenn Layendecker in 1990 and to Gabriel Markus in 1992.

References

Living people
South African male tennis players
1967 births